Tracy E. Perkins (born 1971) is a Sergeant First Class (reduced in rank by court martial to Staff Sergeant) in the U.S. Army.

On 3 January 2004, he forced, at gunpoint, civilian plumbers Zaidoun Hassoun and Marwan Fadel to leap from a road bridge in Samarra, Iraq, into the waters of the River Tigris below. The cousins Hassoun and Fadel had been caught by a U.S. checkpoint after curfew. Fadel managed to reach the riverbank, but claims that he saw Hassoun drown and that the family later retrieved and buried the body.

The battalion commander of the four soldiers, Lt. Col. Nathan Sassaman, was reprimanded for impeding investigators.  On 8 January 2005, a military court in Fort Hood, Texas, U.S., acquitted Perkins of involuntary manslaughter but convicted him of aggravated assault and obstruction of justice. He received a prison term of six months and a reduction in rank.

External links
Soldiers charged in Iraqi drowning
Soldier cleared in drowning case

1971 births
Living people
People convicted of obstruction of justice
American people convicted of assault
American people convicted of war crimes
United States Army personnel of the Iraq War
United States Army soldiers
War crimes in Iraq
United States Army personnel who were court-martialed
United States military war crimes
Prisoners and detainees of the United States military